Dikimevi is an underground station and the eastern terminus of the Ankaray line of the Ankara Metro in Çankaya. It is located under Cemal Gürsel Avenue in Cebeci, three blocks south of Cebeci station. Dikimevi station consists of two side platforms and opened on 30 August 1996, together with the Ankaray line. The line was originally planned to be extended further east in Mamak, however these plans never took place.

References

External links
EGO Ankara - Official website
Ankaray - Official website

Railway stations opened in 1996
Ankara metro stations
1996 establishments in Turkey
Çankaya, Ankara